Howard Paul "Highball" Wilson (August 9, 1878 – October 16, 1934) was a professional baseball pitcher. He played all or parts of four seasons in Major League Baseball, including a stint on the infamous 1899 Cleveland Spiders.

Wilson made just one appearance for the Spiders, pitching a complete game and losing. He spent the 1900 and 1901 seasons with the Norwich Witches of the Connecticut State League, then resurfaced with the Philadelphia Athletics in 1902. During his brief stint in the A's rotation, he compiled a 7–5 record, helping the team to the American League pennant.

In 1903, he pitched for the Washington Senators, posting a 3.31 ERA but losing 18 games for a bad team. His career ended the following season.

References

Major League Baseball pitchers
Cleveland Spiders players
Philadelphia Athletics players
Washington Senators (1901–1960) players
Norwich Witches players
19th-century baseball players
Baseball players from Pennsylvania
1878 births
1934 deaths